Libya competed at the 2004 Summer Paralympics in Athens, Greece. They were represented by 2 sportspeople, neither of whom won a medal. Libya participated in their third Paralympic Games in Athens, sending their smallest delegation to date at the time.  but won no medals.

Sports

Powerlifting

Men

Women

See also
Libya at the Paralympics
Libya at the 2004 Summer Olympics

References 

Nations at the 2004 Summer Paralympics
2004
Paralympics